Sir John Donald Brown Junor (15 January 1919 – 3 May 1997) was a Scottish journalist and editor-in-chief of the Sunday Express between 1954 and 1986, having previously worked as a columnist there. He then moved to The Mail on Sunday.

Early life
Born in Glasgow, he studied at Glasgow University and had a wartime commission in the Fleet Air Arm. At Glasgow University he became president of the University Liberal Club, and later stood unsuccessfully three times for Parliament in Scotland for the Liberal Party. In the 1945 General Election he contested Kincardine and Western Aberdeenshire. He then fought a by-election in 1947 for Edinburgh East, and finally was beaten at Dundee West in 1951. He was knighted in 1980.

Journalism
His Sunday Express column (which he continued to write in his years as editor-in-chief) was noted for recurrent catchphrases, two of them being "pass the sick-bag, Alice" and "I don't know, but I think we should be told". Junor frequently mentioned the small town of Auchtermuchty in Fife.

Junor could be brutally forthright in his column. He once wrote: "[W]ith compatriots like these [the IRA Brighton bombers] wouldn't you rather admit to being a pig than be Irish?" Following complaints that the comment was racist, Junor was censured by the Press Council in May 1985.

He was often lampooned in Private Eye where he was known as 'Sir Jonah Junor', and the Daily Express building on Fleet Street as 'the Black Lubyanka'.

Contempt of Parliament
On 24 January 1957, Junor was called to the Bar of the House of Commons to be reprimanded for contempt of Parliament – the last non-politician to be so called. The matter concerned an article about petrol allocation that appeared in the Sunday Express on 16 December 1956. Junor apologised:

Family
Junor married in 1942, and had two children. The journalist Penny Junor is his daughter, and the journalist Sam Leith, his grandson.

Works
The Best of JJ (1981)
Listening for a midnight tram: memoirs (1990)

References
Penny Junor (2002): Home Truths: Life Around My Father, 
Graham Lord (2012): Lord's Ladies and Gentlemen: 100 Legends of the 20th Century

Notes

1919 births
1997 deaths
Journalists from Glasgow
Alumni of the University of Glasgow
Daily Mail journalists
Scottish columnists
Scottish newspaper editors
Scottish autobiographers
Scottish knights
Artists' Rifles soldiers
Scottish Liberal Party parliamentary candidates
Fleet Air Arm personnel of World War II